Thessalonike,(Θεσσαλονίκη) may refer to:

 Thessalonike of Macedon, a daughter of king Philip II of Macedon
 Thessaloniki, a Greek city named after Thessalonike of Macedon

See also
 Thessaloniki (disambiguation)